"The Queen of Drum" is a narrative poem by C. S. Lewis published by J.M. Dent in 1969, post-humously by Lewis' trustee and literary adviser Walter Hooper. It is noted for its varying meter, but has been criticised for having a weak plot. It is included in the novel Dymer.

Synopsis
In this poignant poem, the Kingdom of Drum is subject to a palace revolution: the top-ranked army general cleanly disposes of the aged king and proclaims himself the replacement monarch. The spirited, young queen - ordered to promptly remarry the general - pretends acquiescence: escaping en route to her place of incarceration.

With the hue-and-cry being raised in pursuit behind her, the fugitive queen employs her woodland skills to lose herself quickly in the depths of the forest. On the move - and free for the moment - she faces a choice of how best she might remove herself beyond the risk of recapture.

References

Narrative poems
1969 poems
20th-century poems
English poetry
Poetry by C. S. Lewis
Dystopian literature